Gasconade may refer to:

 Gasconade County, Missouri
 Gasconade, Missouri, a town in Missouri
 Gasconade River, a river in the Ozarks